The Bunch of Grapes, Knightsbridge is a pub at 207 Brompton Road, Knightsbridge, London SW3.

It is a Grade II listed building, built in the mid-19th century.

References

External links
 

Grade II listed pubs in London
Grade II listed buildings in the Royal Borough of Kensington and Chelsea
Pubs in the Royal Borough of Kensington and Chelsea